Robert Edward Crane (July 13, 1928 – June 29, 1978) was an American actor, drummer, radio personality, and disc jockey known for starring in the CBS situation comedy Hogan's Heroes.

Crane was a drummer from age 11, and he began his entertainment career as a radio personality, beginning in Hornell, New York and later in Connecticut. He then moved to Los Angeles, where he hosted the number-one rated morning radio show. In the early 1960s, Crane moved into acting, eventually landing the lead role of Colonel Robert Hogan in Hogan's Heroes. The series aired from 1965 to 1971, and Crane received two Emmy Award nominations.

Crane's career declined after Hogan's Heroes. He became frustrated with the few roles that he was being offered and began performing in dinner theater. In 1975, he returned to television in the NBC series The Bob Crane Show, but the series received poor ratings and was cancelled after thirteen weeks. Afterward, Crane returned to performing in dinner theater and also appeared in occasional guest spots on television.

Crane was found bludgeoned to death in his Scottsdale, Arizona, apartment while on tour in June 1978 for a dinner theater production of Beginner's Luck. Though Crane's friend John Henry Carpenter was tried and acquitted of the murder, the case remains officially unsolved. Crane's previously uncontroversial public image suffered due to the suspicious nature of his death, and posthumous revelations about his personal life.

Early life
Bob Crane was born in Waterbury, Connecticut, the younger of two sons of Rose Mary (née Ksenich) and Alfred Thomas Crane - the original spelling of the family name was Crean. He spent his childhood and teenaged years in Stamford.

Crane began playing drums at the age of 11, and by junior high was organizing local drum and bugle parades with his neighborhood friends. He joined his high school's orchestra and its marching and jazz bands. Crane also played for the Connecticut and Norwalk Symphony Orchestras as part of their youth orchestra program. He graduated from Stamford High School in 1946. Then, in 1948, he enlisted for two years in the Connecticut Army National Guard and was honorably discharged in 1950. The previous year he married his high-school sweetheart, Anne Terzian. The couple had three children: Robert David, Deborah Anne, and Karen Leslie.

Career

Early career

In 1950, Crane began his career in radio broadcasting at WLEA in Hornell, New York. He soon moved to Connecticut stations WBIS in Bristol and then WICC in Bridgeport, a 1,000-watt operation with a signal covering the northeastern portion of the New York metropolitan area. In 1956, Crane was hired by CBS Radio to host the morning show at its West Coast flagship KNX in Los Angeles, California, partly to re-energize that station's ratings and partly to halt his erosion of suburban ratings at WCBS in New York City. In California, Crane filled the broadcast with sly wit, drumming, and such guests as Marilyn Monroe, Frank Sinatra, and Bob Hope. His show quickly topped the morning ratings with adult listeners in the Los Angeles area, and Crane became "king of the Los Angeles airwaves".

Crane's acting ambitions led to guest-hosting for Johnny Carson on the daytime game show Who Do You Trust? and appearances on The Twilight Zone (uncredited), Channing, Alfred Hitchcock Presents, and General Electric Theater. After Carl Reiner appeared on his radio show, Crane persuaded Reiner to book him for a guest appearance on The Dick Van Dyke Show.

The Donna Reed Show (1963–1964)
After seeing Crane's performance on The Dick Van Dyke Show, Donna Reed offered him a guest shot on her program. After the success of that episode, his character, Dr. David Kelsey, was incorporated into the show's storyline, and Crane became a regular cast member, beginning with the episode "Friends and Neighbors". Crane continued to work full-time at KNX during his stint on The Donna Reed Show, running back and forth from the KNX studio at Columbia Square to Columbia Studios. He left the show in December 1964.

Hogan's Heroes (1965–1971)
In 1965, Crane was offered the starring role in a CBS television sitcom set in a World War II POW camp. Hogan's Heroes involved the sabotage and espionage missions of Allied soldiers, led by Colonel Robert Hogan, from under the noses of the oblivious Germans guarding them. The show was an immediate hit, finishing in the top 10 in its first year. The series lasted for six seasons on CBS, and Crane was nominated for an Emmy Award in 1966 and 1967.

After having a love affair with Hogan co-star Cynthia Lynn, the actress who played Helga, Crane became romantically involved with Lynn's replacement Patricia Olson in 1968, who played Hilda under the stage name Sigrid Valdis. Crane divorced Terzian in 1970, just before their 21st anniversary, and married Olson on the set of the show later that year, with series co-star Richard Dawson serving as best man.
Their son, Scotty, was born in 1971, and they later adopted a daughter, Ana Marie. Crane and Olson separated in 1977, but according to several family members, had reconciled shortly before Crane's death in June, 1978.

After Hogan's Heroes
In 1968, Crane and Hogan co-stars Werner Klemperer, Leon Askin, and John Banner appeared with Elke Sommer in a feature film, The Wicked Dreams of Paula Schultz, set in the divided city of Berlin during the Cold War. In 1969, Crane starred with Abby Dalton in a dinner theater production of Cactus Flower.

Following the cancellation of Hogan's Heroes in 1971, Crane appeared in two Disney films: Superdad (1973), in the title role, and a small role in Gus (1976). In 1973, he purchased the rights to a comedy play called Beginner's Luck and began touring it, as its star and director, at the Showboat Dinner Theatre in St. Petersburg, Florida; the La Mirada Civic Theatre in California; the Windmill Dinner Theatre in Scottsdale, Arizona; and other dinner theaters around the country.

Between theater engagements, Crane guest-starred in a number of television shows, including Police Woman, Gibbsville, Quincy, M.E., and The Love Boat. In 1975, he returned to television with his own series, The Bob Crane Show on NBC, which was cancelled after thirteen episodes. In early 1978, Crane taped a travel documentary in Hawaii and recorded an appearance on the Canadian cooking show Celebrity Cooks. Neither aired in the U.S. after his death the following June. His appearance on Celebrity Cooks was broadcast in Canada in late 1978, and was recreated in the biopic film Auto Focus.

Private life and murder
Crane frequently videotaped and photographed his own sexual escapades. During the run of Hogan's Heroes, Dawson introduced him to John Henry Carpenter, a regional sales manager for Sony Electronics, who often helped famous clients with their video equipment. The two men struck up a friendship and began visiting bars and nightclubs together. Crane attracted many women due to his celebrity status, and he introduced Carpenter to them as his manager. Crane and Carpenter videotaped their joint sexual encounters. Crane's son Robert later insisted that all of the women were aware of the videotaping and consented to it, but several claimed they had no idea that they had been recorded until they were informed by Scottsdale police after Crane's murder. Carpenter later became national sales manager at Akai, and he arranged his business trips to coincide with Crane's dinner-theater touring schedule so that the two could continue videotaping their sexual encounters.

  
In June 1978, Crane was living in the Winfield Place Apartments in Scottsdale during a run of Beginner's Luck at the Windmill Dinner Theatre. On the afternoon of June 29, his co-star Victoria Ann Berry entered his apartment after he failed to show up for a lunch meeting, and discovered his body. Crane had been bludgeoned to death with a weapon that was never identified, though investigators believed it to be a camera tripod. An electrical cord had been tied around his neck.

Crane's funeral was held on July 5, 1978, at St. Paul the Apostle Catholic Church in Westwood, Los Angeles. An estimated 200 family members and friends attended, including John Astin and his wife,  Patty Duke and Carroll O'Connor. Pallbearers included Hogan's Heroes producer Edward Feldman, co-stars Robert Clary and Larry Hovis, and Crane's son Robert. He was interred in Oakwood Memorial Park in Chatsworth, California. Patricia Olson later had his remains relocated to Westwood Village Memorial Park in Westwood, and after her death in 2007, she was buried beside him under her stage name, Sigrid Valdis.

Investigation
The Scottsdale Police Department had no homicide division in 1978, so it was ill-equipped to handle such a high-profile murder investigation. The crime scene yielded few clues; no evidence was found of forced entry, and nothing of value was missing. Detectives examined Crane's extensive videotape collection, which led them to Carpenter, who had flown to Phoenix on June 25 to spend a few days with Crane. Carpenter's rental car was impounded and searched. Several blood smears were found that matched Crane's blood type; no one else of that blood type was known to have been in the car, including Carpenter. DNA testing was not yet available, and the Maricopa County Attorney declined to file charges.

In 1990, Scottsdale Police Detective Barry Vassall and Maricopa County Attorney's Office Investigator Jim Raines re-examined the evidence from 1978 and persuaded the county attorney to reopen the case. DNA testing was inconclusive on the blood found in Carpenter's rental car, but Raines did discover an evidence photograph of the car's interior that appeared to show a piece of brain tissue. The actual tissue samples recovered from the car had been lost, but an Arizona judge ruled that the new evidence was admissible. In June 1992, Carpenter was arrested and charged with Crane's murder.

Trial
At the 1994 trial, Crane's son Robert testified that in the weeks before his father's death, Crane had repeatedly expressed a desire to sever his friendship with Carpenter. He said that Carpenter had become "a hanger-on" and "a nuisance to the point of being obnoxious". "My dad expressed that he just didn't need Carpenter kind of hanging around him anymore," he said. Robert testified that Crane had called Carpenter the night before the murder and ended their friendship.

Carpenter's attorneys attacked the prosecution's case as circumstantial and inconclusive. They presented evidence that Carpenter and Crane were still on good terms, including witnesses from the restaurant where the two men had dined the evening before the murder. They noted that the murder weapon had never been identified nor found; the prosecution's camera tripod theory was sheer speculation, they said, based solely on Carpenter's occupation. They disputed the claim that the newly discovered evidence photo showed brain tissue, and alleged the police work had been sloppy, such as the mishandling and misplacing of evidence—including the crucial tissue sample itself. They pointed out that Crane had been videotaped and photographed in sexual relations with numerous women, implying that any one of them might have been the killer. Other potential suspects proposed by defense attorneys included angry husbands and boyfriends of the women, and an actor who had sworn vengeance after a violent argument with Crane in Texas several months earlier.

Carpenter was acquitted, and he continued to maintain his innocence until his death in 1998. After the trial, Robert speculated publicly that Olson, his father's widow, might have had a role in instigating the crime. "Nobody got a dime out of [the murder]," he said, "except for one person," alluding to Crane's will, which excluded him, his siblings, and his mother, with Crane's entire estate left to Olson. He repeated his suspicions in the 2015 book Crane: Sex, Celebrity, and My Father's Unsolved Murder. Maricopa County District Attorney Rick Romley responded, "We never characterized Patty as a suspect," adding "I am convinced John Carpenter murdered Bob Crane." Officially, Crane's murder remains unsolved.

Later DNA testing
In November 2016, the Maricopa County Attorney's Office permitted Phoenix television reporter John Hook to submit the 1978 blood samples from Carpenter's rental car for retesting, using a more advanced DNA technique than the one used in 1990. Two sequences were identified, one from an unknown male, and the other too degraded to reach a conclusion. This testing consumed all of the remaining DNA from the rental car, making further tests impossible. Hook's investigation turned up two blood vials, samples from Crane and Carpenter, located in evidence storage at the Maricopa County Attorney's Office. Carpenter voluntarily gave a sample to Scottsdale Police when he was questioned in 1978. Crane's blood vial was recovered during his autopsy the day after the murder. Both were used as comparison samples for Hook's DNA tests on the blood stains found in Carpenter's rental car, performed by Bode/Cellmark Labs.

Auto Focus
Bob Crane's life and murder were the subject of the 2002 feature film Auto Focus, directed by Paul Schrader and starring Greg Kinnear as Crane. The film, based on a book on Crane's murder written by Zodiac author Robert Graysmith, was described as "brilliant" by critic Roger Ebert. The film portrays Crane as a happily married, church-going family man who succumbs to Hollywood's celebrity lifestyle after becoming a television star. When he meets John Carpenter, played by Willem Dafoe, and as a result of their friendship learns about then-new home video technology, he descends into a life of strip clubs, BDSM, and sex addiction.

Crane's son with Olson, Scotty, challenged the film's accuracy in an October 2002 review. "During the last twelve years of his life," he wrote, "[Crane] went to church three times: when I was baptized, when his father died, and when he was buried." His son further stated that Crane was a sex addict long before he became a star, and that he may have begun recording his sexual encounters as early as 1956. There was no evidence, he said, that Crane engaged in BDSM; there were no such scenes in any of his hundreds of home movies, and Schrader admitted that the film's BDSM scene was based on his own experience (while writing Hardcore). Before production on Auto Focus was announced, Scotty and Olson had shopped a rival script alternatively titled F-Stop or Take Off Your Clothes and Smile, but interest ceased after Auto Focus was announced.

In June 2001, Scotty launched the website bobcrane.com. It included a paid section featuring photographs, outtakes from his father's sex films, and Crane's autopsy report that proved, he said, that his father did not have a penile implant as stated in Auto Focus. The site was renamed "Bob Crane: The Official Web Site", but is now abandoned. The "official" Bob Crane website was maintained by CMG Worldwide. The website no longer exists.

Filmography

Film

Television

Awards and nominations

References

Further reading
 
 
 Hook, John. "Who Killed Bob Crane? The Final Close-Up". Brisance Books Group (2016). 
 Crane, Robert and Fryer, Christopher. Crane: Sex, Celebrity, and My Father's Unsolved Murder. University Press of Kentucky (2015). 
 Crime and Investigation Network. "Murder in Scottsdale : The Death of Bob Crane". Video. Published May 30, 2014.
 Ford, Carol M., Young, Dee, and Groundwater, Linda. Bob Crane: The Definitive Biography. AuthorMike Ink (2015). 
 Fox 10 Phoenix (KSAZ-TV). Who killed Bob Crane? A closer look at evidence in the 1978 murder investigation. Videos.  Published November 14, 2016.
 Graysmith, Robert. The Murder of Bob Crane: Who Killed the Star of Hogan's Heroes?. Crown Publishers, New York (1993). 
 Scott, A.O. "The Bob Crane Story: Everything but a Hero". The New York Times, October 4, 2002

External links

 
 
 
 

1928 births
1978 deaths
1978 murders in the United States
20th-century American male actors
Male actors from Connecticut
American male film actors
American radio DJs
American male stage actors
American male television actors
Burials at Westwood Village Memorial Park Cemetery
Deaths by beating in the United States
Actors from Waterbury, Connecticut
People murdered in Arizona
Connecticut National Guard personnel
United States Army soldiers
Unsolved murders in the United States
20th-century American musicians
Connecticut Republicans
Deaths from bleeding
Deaths from head injury
American murder victims
Stamford High School (Stamford, Connecticut) alumni